Beaver Island Harbor Light (or St. James Light) is a lighthouse located in St. James, Michigan, on the northern end of Beaver Island on Lake Michigan. It has also been called "St. James Harbor Light" and "Whiskey Point Light". It is associated with a U.S. Coast Guard station, which was formerly a lifesaving station. The tower is constructed of Cream City Brick.

Whiskey Point was originally named for the 1838 fur trading post that operated on the point, and for the commodity that was the post's chief item of sale. Soon afterward in the 1850s, St. James's Harbor on Beaver Island became established as a safe haven in a storm (an event quite common on Lake Michigan). The light was thus a natural extension of the emergency usage. The original light was constructed in 1856, and the light currently in use was constructed in 1870.

At this time, the harbor is used by the Beaver Island ferry, so the light is still an active aid to navigation.

See also
Beaver Island Head Light

References

External links 

Aerial photos, Beaver Harbor Lighthouse, marinas.com.
Clarke Historical Library, Central Michigan University, Bibliography for Charlevoix County.
History of the Beaver Island (Whiskey Point) Lights by the Beaver Beacon.

Lighthouses completed in 1856
Lighthouses completed in 1870
Buildings and structures in Charlevoix County, Michigan
Lighthouses on the National Register of Historic Places in Michigan
Transportation in Charlevoix County, Michigan
National Register of Historic Places in Charlevoix County, Michigan